Leonhard "Leo" Pohl (18 July 1929 – 23 April 2014) was a German athlete who mainly competed in the 100 metres. He was born in Allenstein (today Olsztyn, Poland) and died in Pfungstadt, Germany.

He competed for the United Team of Germany in the 1956 Summer Olympics held in Melbourne, Australia where he won the bronze medal in the 4 x 100 metre relay with his teammates Lothar Knörzer, Heinz Fütterer and Manfred Germar.

References

1929 births
2014 deaths
Sportspeople from Olsztyn
People from East Prussia
German male sprinters
Olympic bronze medalists for the United Team of Germany
Athletes (track and field) at the 1956 Summer Olympics
Olympic athletes of the United Team of Germany
Medalists at the 1956 Summer Olympics
Olympic bronze medalists in athletics (track and field)